Berroeta is a village located in the municipality of Baztan, Navarre, Spain.

References 

Populated places in Navarre